Thelyssina sterrha is a species of extremely small deep water sea snail, a marine gastropod mollusk in the family Seguenziidae.

Distribution
This marine species occurs off New Zealand.

References

External links
 To Biodiversity Heritage Library (1 publication)
 To Encyclopedia of Life
 To World Register of Marine Species

Thelyssina
Gastropods described in 1983